Brest station (French: Gare de Brest) is the railway station serving Brest, France. It is the western terminus of the Paris–Brest railway. The new station, built above the town's harbour in 1932 on the site of its 1865 predecessor, includes a tall clock tower and a semi circle passenger hall. The current building of 1932, by the CF de l'Etat, replaces the older building built in 1865 by the CF de l'Ouest.

The station saw the arrival of the TGV Atlantique in 1990 but saw little changes to its structure.

Brest is linked to Rennes and Paris as well as regional (TER) services to Brittany including Quimper, Landerneau, Morlaix and Lannion (via Plouaret-Trégor). TGV trains to Paris take approximately less than three and a half hours to reach the capital.

References

External links
 
 

Railway stations in Finistère
TER Bretagne
Transport in Brest, France
Buildings and structures in Brest, France
Railway stations in France opened in 1865
Gare de Brest
20th-century architecture in France